Ratt or RATT may refer to:

Ratt, an American glam metal band.
 Ratt (album), the sixth album of the band Ratt
 Ratt (EP), self-titled extended play record from the band Ratt
 Ratt: The Video, video by the band Ratt
 “Ratt", Commodore 64 programmer Antony Crowther
 Radioteletype, a telecommunications system sometimes known by the acronym RATT (Radio Automatic Teletype)
 Regia Autonomă de Transport Timişoara (RATT), the tram system of Timișoara, Romania
 Rescue All Terrain Transport (RATT), US Air Force special operations casualties vehicle

See also
 
 
 Raat (disambiguation)
 Rat (disambiguation)
 RRAT